Anisur Rahman Anis ( – 28 April 2019) was a Bangladeshi film, television and theatre actor who acted in more than 250 films. He was known for acting in comic roles.

Biography
Anisur Rahman Anis was born in Jalpaiguri District in 1940. His country house is situated in South Ballavpur, Chhagalnaiya, Feni. He entered into Dhallywood with Bishkonya in 1960 which was an unreleased film. His first released film was Eito Jibon which was released in 1964. Jemon Jamai Temon Bou was his last film. He also acted in television and theatre. He was known for playing the character Golam Hossain in the play Nawab Sirajuddoula in the theatre arena of Bangladesh.

Anis married his cousin Kulsum Ara Begum in 1965. She died in 2013. They had two daughters.

Anis died on 28 April 2019 at the age of 78.

Selected filmography

References

Further reading
 

1940s births
2019 deaths
People from Feni District
Bangladeshi male television actors
Bangladeshi male film actors
Bengali television actors
Bangladeshi male stage actors
Male actors from West Bengal
People from Jalpaiguri district
Bengali actors
Bengali male actors
20th-century Bengalis
Bangladeshi Muslims